Dato' Mohd Imran bin Tamrin is a Malaysian politician who has served as Member of the Selangor State Legislative Assembly (MLA) for Sungai Panjang since May 2018. He is a member of the United Malays National Organisation, a component party of the Barisan Nasional (BN) state opposition but federal ruling coalition.

Election results

Selangor State Legislative Assembly

Honour
  :
  Knight Companion of the Order of the Crown of Pahang (DIMP) – Dato' (2015)

References

1986 births
Living people
Selangor politicians
Members of the Selangor State Legislative Assembly
United Malays National Organisation politicians